Rankuh District is a district (bakhsh) in Amlash County, Gilan Province, Iran. At the 2006 census, its population was 16,392, in 4,619 families.  The District has one city: Rankuh. The District has three rural districts (dehestan): Kojid Rural District, Shabkhus Lat Rural District, and Somam Rural District.

References 

Amlash County
Districts of Gilan Province